Sportdigital is a sports-oriented television channel in Germany. The channel broadcasts on various cable and satellite packages including Sky Deutschland and broadcasts uninterrupted sports coverage daily.

Coverage includes KHL Hockey, Brazilian Championship, Argentine Primera División, Major League Soccer, Scottish Premiership, Australian A-League and numerous other sports.

External links
 Official website 

Television stations in Germany
Television channels and stations established in 2008
Sports television in Germany
German-language television stations
2008 establishments in Germany
Mass media in Hamburg